Szelejewo Pierwsze  is a village in the administrative district of Gmina Piaski, within Gostyń County, Greater Poland Voivodeship, in west-central Poland.

The village has a population of 514.

References

Szelejewo Pierwsze